Frontera Grill is a Mexican restaurant in Chicago, Illinois. It is owned by Rick Bayless. It opened on March 21, 1987, at 445 N. Clark Street in Chicago's River North neighborhood and was Bayless' first restaurant.  In 2011, the Chicago Sun-Times called it "a study in the art of Mexican cookery".

In 1994, Frontera Grill was ranked the world's third-best casual dining restaurant by the International Herald Tribune.  In 2007, Frontera Grill won the James Beard Foundation's "Outstanding Restaurant" award, designating it the best restaurant in the U.S.

Although Frontera Grill is not a chain, the restaurant's name brand and logo are used in several of Bayless' other restaurants including Tortas Frontera at Chicago's O'Hare airport, Frontera Fresco (closed January 2020), and Frontera Cocina in Disney Springs, Florida.  The brand and logo were also leveraged when Bayless founded his Frontera Foods line of pre-packaged foods in 1996. The packaged food line was sold to Chicago food processing company ConAgra in 2016.

References

External links
 

Mexican-American culture in Chicago
Restaurants in Chicago
Restaurants established in 1987
1987 establishments in Illinois
Latin American restaurants in Chicago
Mexican restaurants in the United States